Coleosporium ipomoeae is a plant pathogen. Specifically, it is a fungus that can develop on sweet potatoes.

Fungal plant pathogens and diseases
Eudicot diseases
Pucciniales
Fungi described in 1885